Love Session is the fourth studio album by American R&B group Silk. It was released by Elektra Records on June 12, 2001 in the United States. Chiefly produced by Darrell "Delite" Allamby and Silk, it reached number 20 on the US Billboard 200 and number two on the Top R&B/Hip-Hop Albums chart. The album was the last recording the band released under a major label and also marked their last project to be recorded as a quintet after the departure of member Gary Jenkins in 2002.

Promotion
The first single released from the album was "We're Callin' You". The music video was directed by Sylvain White. Love Session also contains a popular cover of the single "Ebony Eyes," originally recorded by Rick James as a duet with Smokey Robinson from his 1983 album Cold Blooded. Silk's version was released as the album's second single in 2001.

Critical reception

AllMusic editor Kingsley Marshall remarked that "although the cover of the Rick James and Smokey Robinson duet "Ebony Eyes" does the original little justice, the rest of the album is as slick as can be, and if you're still in need of freaking close to ten years on from "Freak Me" then you won't go far wrong with this." NME found that "lyrical cliches undermine the power of this fourth missive from Silk."

Track listing 

Notes
  signifies a co-producer

Charts

Weekly charts

Year-end charts

Release history

References

2001 albums
Silk (group) albums